The 2022 Rey de Reyes (Spanish for "2022 King of Kings") was a professional wrestling tournament and supercard event produced by the Mexican Lucha Libre AAA Worldwide (AAA) promotion. It was held on February 19, 2022, at Estadio Universitario Beto Ávila in Veracruz, Veracruz, Mexico. The 2022 event was the 25th Rey de Reyes show and tournament.

The card comprised eight matches, including one dark match. In the main event, Hijo del Vikingo defeated Johnny Superstar (who previously appeared in AAA as Johnny Mundo) to retain the AAA Mega Championship. In other prominent matches, Psycho Clown become the 2022 Rey de Reyes by defeating Cibernético, Laredo Kid, Bandido, and the returning Heavy Metal in a five-way match, and the returning Taya defeated Lady Shani, Flammer Maravilla, and Keyra in a five-way match-way to become the #1 contender for Deonna Purrazzo's Reina de Reinas Championship.

Production

Background
Since 1997 and every year except 2020, the Mexican Lucha Libre, or professional wrestling, company AAA has held a Rey de Reyes (Spanish for "King of Kings") show in the spring. The 1997 version was held in February, while all subsequent Rey de Reyes shows were held in March. As part of their annual Rey de Reyes event AAA holds the eponymous Rey de Reyes tournament to determine that specific year's Rey. Most years the show hosts both the qualifying round and the final match, but on occasion the qualifying matches have been held prior to the event as part of AAA's weekly television shows. The traditional format consists of four preliminary rounds, each a Four-man elimination match with each of the four winners face off in the tournament finals, again under elimination rules. There have been years where AAA has employed a different format to determine a winner. The winner of the Rey de Reyes tournament is given a large ornamental sword to symbolize their victory, but is normally not guaranteed any other rewards for winning the tournament, although some years becoming the Rey de Reyes has earned the winner a match for the AAA Mega Championship. From 1999 through 2009 AAA also held an annual Reina de Reinas ("Queen of Queens") tournament, but later turned that into an actual championship that could be defended at any point during the year, abandoning the annual tournament concept. The 2022 show will be the 25th Rey de Reyes show in the series.

Storylines
Rey de Reyes featured eight professional wrestling matches that involved wrestlers from scripted feuds. The wrestlers portrayed either heels (referred to as rudos in Mexico, those that play the part of the "bad guys") or faces (técnicos in Mexico, the "good guy" characters) as they performed.

Results

See also
2022 in professional wrestling

References

2022 in Mexico
2022 in professional wrestling
February 2022 events in Mexico
Rey de Reyes